Genç Kalemler (Ottoman Turkish: Young Pens) was an Ottoman literary and cultural magazine which was one of the earliest nationalist publications in the Ottoman Empire. Murat Belge describes it as a pan-Turkist publication. It was published between April 1911 and October 1912 in Thessaloniki, Ottoman Empire, and was the first Ottoman publication which called for having a national language.

History and profile
Genç Kalemler was first published on 11 April 1911 as a successor of Hüsn ve Şiir, a literary magazine. The founders were the members of the national literary movement: Ziya Gökalp, Ömer Seyfettin and Ali Canip Yöntem. They supported the use of pure Turkish. 

The major tenet of the magazine was to implement the language reform to simplify the Ottoman language to improve the literacy rates and to avoid the dissolution of the Ottoman Empire. Another major view of the magazine contributors was that the Ottoman Turkish could not be a national language due to its artificial nature and that Istanbul Turkish should be adopted as the official language of the Empire. Ziya Gökalp's poem entitled Turan was first published in the magazine. Genç Kalemler published a total of thirty-three issues before ceasing publication in October 1912.

References

External links

1911 establishments in the Ottoman Empire
1912 disestablishments in the Ottoman Empire
Cultural magazines published in Turkey
Defunct political magazines published in Turkey
Magazines established in 1911
Magazines disestablished in 1912
Mass media in Thessaloniki
Turkish-language magazines
Turkish nationalism